Harpesaurus is a genus of lizards in the family Agamidae. The genus is endemic to Indonesia.

Geographic range
Species of the genus Harpesaurus are found on some islands in Indonesia.

Habitat
The natural habitat of lizards of the genus Harpesaurus is forests.

Species
Six species are recognized as being valid.
Harpesaurus beccarii  – Sumatra nose-horned lizard
Harpesaurus borneensis 
Harpesaurus brooksi 
Harpesaurus ensicauda  – Nias nose-horned lizard
Harpesaurus modiglianii  – Modigliani's nose-horned lizard
Harpesaurus tricinctus  – Java nose-horned lizard

The species formerly known as H. thescelorhinos  is a synonym of H. borneensis.

The Sumatran species H. modiglianii was previously known only from the type specimen, collected in 1891, but was found again in 2018.

Nota bene: A binomial authority in parentheses indicates that the species was originally described in a genus other than Harpesaurus.

References

Further reading
Boulenger GA (1885). Catalogue of the Lizards in the British Museum (Natural History). Second Edition. Volume I. ... Agamidæ. London: Trustees of the British Museum (Natural History). (Taylor and Francis, printers). xii + 436 pp. + Plates I-XXXII. (Harpesaurus, new genus, p. 279).

External links
Rochmyaningih, Dyna (2020). "A nose-horned dragon lizard lost to science for over 100 years has been found". Science News, June 9, 2020.

Harpesaurus
Lizard genera
Taxa named by George Albert Boulenger